John Peter Sullivan (born January 3, 1941, in Somerville, New Jersey) is an American former Major League Baseball catcher and coach. A left-handed batter who threw right-handed, Sullivan stood 6' (183 cm) tall and weighed 195 pounds (89 kg) as an active player.

Playing career
After graduating from Bernards High School, Sullivan signed with the Detroit Tigers in 1959 and made his debut with them in the waning days of the  season. He played in five major league seasons with Detroit (1963–65), the New York Mets and Philadelphia Phillies, appearing in 116 games, with 59 hits in 259 at bats, batting .228 with two home runs and 18 runs batted in. His only substantial terms of MLB service were as a reserve catcher for the 1965 Tigers and 1967 Mets, for whom he played his only full season in MLB. He played eight years at the Triple-A level.

Coaching career
Sullivan began managing in minor league baseball in 1973 in the Kansas City Royals' farm system. During six seasons, he rose from Rookie ball to Triple-A, winning four league championships and compiling a stellar .601 winning percentage (434 victories and 288 defeats). His only under .500 club, the 1978 Omaha Royals, who finished 66–69, nevertheless topped their division and defeated the Indianapolis Indians for the American Association championship.

In 1979, Sullivan began a 15-year run as a Major League coach, serving with the Royals (1979), Atlanta Braves (1980–81) and Toronto Blue Jays (1982–93). He was brought to Toronto by Bobby Cox after Cox' first term as Braves' manager, and remained with the club under Cox successors Jimy Williams and Cito Gaston, coaching on the Blue Jays' 1992 and 1993 World Series championship teams. His final game was Game 6 of the 1993 World Series, during which he caught Joe Carter's game-winning home run in the bullpen. Sullivan's retirement was announced at the Blue Jays' championship celebration, and he was asked to unveil the 1993 World Series Championship banner at the end of festivities.

Sullivan currently resides in Dansville, New York.

External links
 Baseball Reference
 Retrosheet

References

 Howe News Bureau, Toronto Blue Jays 1984 Organization Book. St. Petersburg. Fla.: The Baseball Library, 1984.
 Johnson, Lloyd, and Wolff, Miles, eds., The Encyclopedia of Minor League Baseball, 3rd edition. Durham, N.C.: Baseball America, 2007.

1941 births
Living people
Atlanta Braves coaches
Baseball players from New Jersey
Bernards High School alumni

Birmingham Barons players
Detroit Tigers players
Durham Bulls players
Erie Sailors players
Jacksonville Suns players
Kansas City Royals coaches
Knoxville Smokies players
Major League Baseball bullpen coaches
Major League Baseball catchers
Minor league baseball managers
New York Mets players
Omaha Royals players
Philadelphia Phillies players
Rochester Red Wings players
San Diego Padres (minor league) players
Sportspeople from Somerville, New Jersey
Syracuse Chiefs players
Toronto Blue Jays coaches
Vancouver Mounties players